Tephritis fascigera or the Senecio gall fly is a species of fruit fly that is endemic to New Zealand. It is a member of the genus Tephritis of the family Tephritidae, one of two families that are called "fruit flies". Its grubs gall in stems and capitula of plants in the Senecio genus.

References

Tephritinae
Diptera of New Zealand
Insects described in 1931